Albizia suluensis, the Zulu albizia, is a species of plant in the family Fabaceae. It is found only in South Africa. It is threatened by habitat loss.

References

suluensis
Flora of South Africa
Taxonomy articles created by Polbot